Labeobarbus nedgia is a species of ray-finned fish in the genus Labeobarbus which is endemic to Lake Tana and its tributaries in Ethiopia.

References 

Endemic fauna of Ethiopia
nedgia
Taxa named by Eduard Rüppell
Fish described in 1835
Fish of Lake Tana